This is a list of winners and nominees of the Primetime Emmy Award for Outstanding Short Form Nonfiction or Reality Series.

History
The category was initiated in 2016 alongside Outstanding Short Form Comedy or Drama Series and Outstanding Short Form Variety Series. The awards replaced the now-retired category for Outstanding Short-Format Live-Action Entertainment Program. These awards are not presented at the Primetime Emmy Awards show, but at the Creative Arts Emmy Award show.

Winners and nominations

2010s
Outstanding Special Class — Short-Format Nonfiction Programs

Outstanding Short Form Nonfiction or Reality Series

2020s

Programs with multiple nominations

7 nominations
 Jay Leno's Garage

5 nominations
 Top Chef: Last Chance Kitchen

3 nominations
 Pose: Identity, Family, Community

2 nominations
 Between the Scenes — The Daily Show
 Comedians in Cars Getting Coffee
 Creating Saturday Night Live
 Full Frontal with Samantha Bee Presents: Pandemic Video Diaries
 National Endowment for the Arts: United States of Arts
 RuPaul's Drag Race: Out of the Closet
 30 for 30 Shorts

References

Short Form Nonfiction or Reality Series
Awards established in 2011